This is a list of airports that All Nippon Airways flies to.

List

References

Lists of airline destinations
All Nippon Airways
Star Alliance destinations